Sidi El Ansari Mosque, is a Tunisian mosque located in the Kâadine hood in the north of the medina of Tunis near the Bab Souika suburb. It is annexed to a mausoleum.

Localization
It can be found in 43 El Kâadine Street.

Etymology
The mosque got its name from a saint called Sidi El Ansari, a descending from El Rasâa family. He is buried in it.

History

According to the commemorative plaque, it was built in 1905 under the orders of Muhammad IV al-Hadi, a bey of Tunis from the Husainid dynasty who ruled from 1902 until his death.

References 

Mosques in Tunis
20th-century mosques